Tax protesters in the United States advance a number of constitutional arguments asserting that the imposition, assessment and collection of the federal income tax violates the United States Constitution.  These kinds of arguments, though related to, are distinguished from statutory and administrative arguments, which presuppose the constitutionality of the income tax, as well as from general conspiracy arguments, which are based upon the proposition that the three branches of the federal government are involved together in a deliberate, on-going campaign of deception for the purpose of defrauding individuals or entities of their wealth or profits.  Although constitutional challenges to U.S. tax laws are frequently directed towards the validity and effect of the Sixteenth Amendment, assertions that the income tax violates various other provisions of the Constitution have been made as well.

First Amendment
Some protesters argue that imposition of income taxes violates the First Amendment freedom of speech because 
 it requires the subject of the tax to write information on a tax return.
 violates freedom of religion if the subject of the tax claims some religious objection to the payment of taxes, particularly if the subject styles himself or herself as a Reverend, Minister, or other religious office-holder. While the Internal Revenue Code makes an exemption for churches and other religious institutions, it makes only special tax codes and deductions, not exceptions, for religious professionals. The United States Supreme Court held in 1878 Reynolds v. United States, that a religious belief, however strongly held, does not exempt the believer from adhering to general laws.

Fifth Amendment

Self incrimination
Other protesters argue that the Fifth Amendment right against self-incrimination allows an individual to refuse to file an income tax return calling for information that could lead to a conviction for criminal acts from which the income was derived, or for the crime of not paying the tax itself. In response, the courts generally refer to the case of United States v. Sullivan, where Justice Oliver Wendell Holmes wrote:

In short, a person could refuse to answer a question if that particular answer could incriminate them, e.g., a professional killer could decline to answer the question of what his or her occupation was. All that is necessary to ask is, could the answer to the question, alone, provide a "link in the chain" necessary to provide evidence to a crime. Saying your occupation is "assassin" or "professional killer" could, and therefore the 5th Amendment could be invoked as to that question; saying you made $635,000 last year does not provide evidence of anything criminal and thus it could not.

Takings Clause
Some protesters have argued that the income tax is a prohibited "takings" under the Fifth Amendment's Takings Clause, and can not be imposed unless the taxpayer receives just compensation. The United States Supreme Court rejected this argument in Brushaber v. Union Pacific Railroad.  The takings argument and variations of this argument have been officially identified as legally frivolous federal tax return positions for purposes of the $5,000 frivolous tax return penalty imposed under Internal Revenue Code section 6702(a).

Due Process Clause
Protesters argue that the income tax violates the Fifth Amendment right that no person shall be "deprived of life, liberty, or property, without due process of law". However, people can be deprived of life, liberty, or property with due process of law — this is what the courts do.  Legal commentator Daniel B. Evans describes:

Fifth Amendment due process arguments by tax protesters were rejected by the United States Court of Appeals for the Third Circuit in Kahn v. United States, by the United States Court of Appeals for the Fifth Circuit in Anderson v. United States, by the United States Court of Appeals for the Seventh Circuit in Cameron v. Internal Revenue Serv., by the United States Court of Appeals for the Eighth Circuit in Baskin v. United States, by the United States Court of Appeals for the Ninth Circuit in Jolly v. United States, and by the United States Court of Appeals for the Tenth Circuit in Martinez v. Internal Revenue Serv.

Thirteenth Amendment
Tax protesters have argued that income taxes impose involuntary servitude in violation of the Thirteenth Amendment. That argument was ruled to be without merit in Porth v. Brodrick, United States Collector of Internal Revenue for the State of Kansas.  The involuntary servitude argument, and variations of this argument, have been officially identified as legally frivolous federal tax return positions for purposes of the $5,000 frivolous tax return penalty imposed under Internal Revenue Code section 6702(a).

Fourteenth Amendment
Some tax protesters, notably among the sovereign citizen movement, argue that all Americans are citizens of individual states as opposed to citizens of the United States, and that the United States government therefore has no power to tax citizens or impose other federal laws outside of Washington D.C. and other federal enclaves. They cite the first sentence of Section 1 of the Fourteenth Amendment which states, "All persons born or naturalized in the United States, and subject to the jurisdiction thereof, are citizens of the United States and of the State wherein they reside."

Courts have uniformly held that this argument that the Fourteenth Amendment deprived state citizens of U.S. citizenship is plainly incorrect. In Kantor v. Wellesley Galleries, Ltd., the court explained that "[w]hile the Fourteenth Amendment does not create a national citizenship, it has the effect of making that citizenship 'paramount and dominant' instead of 'derivative and dependent' upon state citizenship". See also United States v. Ward, Fox v. Commissioner, and United States v. Baker.

Another argument raised is that because the federal income tax is progressive, the discriminations and inequalities created by the tax should render the tax unconstitutional under the 14th Amendment, which guarantees equal protection under the law. Such arguments have been ruled without merit under contemporary jurisprudence.  Notably, some tax protesters contend that the Fourteenth Amendment itself was never properly ratified, under the theory that the governments of southern states that supported the post-Civil War constitutional amendments were not representative of the people.

Sixteenth Amendment 

It has been argued that the imposition of the U.S. federal income tax is illegal because the Sixteenth Amendment, which grants Congress the "power to lay and collect taxes on incomes, from whatever source derived, without apportionment among the several States, and without regard to any census or enumeration," was not properly ratified, or that the amendment provides no power to tax income from labor. Proper ratification of the Sixteenth Amendment is disputed by tax protesters who argue that the quoted text of the Amendment differed from the text proposed by Congress, or that Ohio was not a State during ratification. Sixteenth Amendment ratification arguments have been rejected in every court case where they have been raised and have been identified as legally frivolous.

Some protesters have argued that because the Sixteenth Amendment does not contain the words "repeal" or "repealed", the Amendment is ineffective to change the law.  Others argue that due to language in Stanton v. Baltic Mining Co., the income tax is an unconstitutional direct tax that should be apportioned (divided equally amongst the population of the various states).  Several tax protesters assert that the Congress has no constitutional power to tax labor or income from labor, citing a variety of court cases. These arguments include claims that the word "income" as used in the Sixteenth Amendment cannot be interpreted as applying to wages; that wages are not income because labor is exchanged for them; that taxing wages violates individuals' right to property, and several others.

Seventeenth Amendment
An argument raised in the case of Trohimovich v. Commissioner is that the Seventeenth Amendment to the United States Constitution was not properly ratified, and that all laws passed by Congress since the year 1919 (which was not the year of ratification) are invalid. The Trohimovich case involved a criminal contempt charge against the taxpayer in connection with a failure to obey a subpoena to produce books and records needed for the trial of the case. The United States Tax Court stated:

The court rejected the taxpayer's arguments, and ordered that "he be imprisoned for 30 days as punishment" for criminal contempt in failing to obey court orders or subpoenas.

Titles of Nobility Amendment
Another tax protester argument centers upon the pending and inoperative Titles of Nobility Amendment.  Proposed as an amendment to the Constitution by the 11th Congress in 1810, it would, if ratified by the required number of states, strip United States citizenship from any citizen who accepted a title of nobility from a foreign government.  The contention here is that this amendment was in fact ratified by the required number of states (in the 1810s) to have become an operative part of the Constitution, and that, because this is so, actions taken by lawyers and judges, who use the title Esquire–asserted to be a title of nobility and monarchical–are unconstitutional. In fact, the use of "Esquire" by lawyers and judges is merely an informal custom in the United States, not a title with any legal standing. This contention, rarely raised before courts, was most recently addressed in Campion v. Towns, No.CV-04-1516PHX-ROS, *2 n.1 (D. Ariz. 2005) as a defense to a charge of tax evasion. The court replied:

Federal government authority 

Neither the U.S. Supreme Court nor any other federal court has ruled that an income tax imposed under the Internal Revenue Code of 1986 is unconstitutional.  Under the Supreme Court ruling in Cheek v. United States, a defendant in a tax evasion prosecution who has made arguments that the federal income tax laws are unconstitutional may have the arguments turned against him (or her). Such arguments, even if based on honestly held beliefs, may constitute evidence that helps the prosecutor prove willfulness, one of the elements of tax evasion.

Sovereign individual and government privilege

Some tax protesters argue that they should be immune from federal income taxation because they are sovereign individuals or "natural individuals," or on the ground that they have not requested a privilege or benefit from the government. These kinds of arguments have been ruled without merit. For example, in the case of Lovell v. United States the United States Court of Appeals for the Seventh Circuit stated:

The Court of Appeals in Lovell affirmed a U.S. District Court order upholding a frivolous return penalty under . Similarly, in United States v. Sloan, the taxpayer's contention — that he is "not a citizen of the United States, but rather, that he is a freeborn, natural individual, a citizen of the State of Indiana, and a 'master'—not 'servant'—of his government" — was ruled to be not a legal ground for the argument that the taxpayer was not subject to the federal tax laws; the tax evasion conviction was upheld by the United States Court of Appeals for the Seventh Circuit. Similarly, the United States Court of Appeals for the Third Circuit stated, in Powers v. Commissioner: "Powers [the taxpayer] contends that either he is immune from the tax laws, or he is a 'slave' to the federal government. This false choice is a creature of Powers' tax protester ideology, not the laws of this Republic." Similarly, in 2008 the United States Court of Appeals for the Tenth Circuit rejected a taxpayer's argument that gains of an individual's labor could be taxed only if the gains were received from a "federal venue". In that case, the taxpayer's argument—that the IRS had no ability to impose a tax on the taxpayer because he was a citizen "of the several states," but not a "federal U.S. citizen"—was ruled to be frivolous.

Variations of the argument that an individual is a "sovereign" have been rejected in tax cases such as United States v. Hart, Risner v. Commissioner, Maxwell v. Snow, Rowe v. Internal Revenue Serv., Cobin v. Commissioner, and Glavin v. United States.

The argument that an individual who received Form W-2 wages or other compensation is not subject to federal income tax because the individual has "neither requested, obtained, nor exercised any privilege from an agency of government" was ruled frivolous by the United States Court of Appeals for the First Circuit in Sullivan v. United States and again in Kelly v. United States. See also United States v. Buras (argument that the taxpayer can be subject to an excise tax only if he benefits from a "privilege extended by a government agency" was rejected).; Nichols v. United States; and Olson v. United States.

The argument that an individual who received Form W-2 wages is not subject to federal income tax unless the tax is imposed in connection with "government granted privileges" was ruled frivolous by the United States Court of Appeals for the Seventh Circuit in Coleman v. Commissioner. The argument that an individual who received Form W-2 wages is not subject to federal income tax unless the taxpayer enjoys a "grant of privilege or franchise" was ruled frivolous by the United States Court of Appeals for the Eighth Circuit in May v. Commissioner. The argument that an individual who received Form W-2 wages is not subject to federal income tax unless the taxpayer has obtained a "privilege from a governmental agency" was ruled frivolous by the United States Court of Appeals for the Ninth Circuit in Olson v. United States, and by the United States Court of Appeals for the Tenth Circuit in Prout v. United States.

In the case of Steward Machine Company v. Davis, the Supreme Court rejected the argument that "the relation of employment is one so essential to the pursuit of happiness that it may not be burdened with a tax," and upheld the validity of the Social Security tax. The Court stated: ". . . natural rights, so called, are as much subject to taxation as rights of less importance. An excise is not limited to vocations or activities that may be prohibited altogether. It is not limited to those that are the outcome of a franchise. It extends to vocations or activities pursued as of common right.".

Regarding the taxability of income in connection with events or activities not involving a government privilege or franchise, the United States Supreme Court stated in United States v. Sullivan that gains from illegal traffic in liquor are subject to the Federal income tax. The U.S. Supreme Court ruled in Rutkin v. United States that the receipt of money obtained by extortion is taxable as income to the wrongdoer. The U.S. Supreme Court ruled in James v. United States that the receipt of money obtained through embezzlement is taxable as income to the wrongdoer, even though the wrongdoer is required to return the money to its owner.

The argument that a person's income is not taxed when the person rejects or renounces United States citizenship because the person claims to be a citizen exclusively of a state, and variations of this argument, have been officially identified as legally frivolous federal tax return positions for purposes of the $5,000 frivolous tax return penalty imposed under Internal Revenue Code section 6702(a).

Federal zone 
Some tax protesters argue that under Article I, section 8, clause 17 of the Constitution, federal income taxes can be imposed only inside so called "federal zones", areas —such as the District of Columbia, military bases or other places– over which Congress has direct authority.

This argument is based in part on the U.S. Supreme Court decision in the case of United States v. Bevans. In Bevans, the parties argued over whether a federal court in Massachusetts had jurisdiction over the case of a U.S. Marine charged with a murder that occurred on a ship in Boston Harbor. No issues regarding federal income taxation or the Internal Revenue Code were presented to or decided by the Court in the Bevans case. The Internal Revenue Code and the Internal Revenue Service did not yet exist in 1818, when the Bevans murder case was decided.

The Clause 17 argument was specifically rejected in the case of United States v. Sato:

The Clause 17 argument was also unsuccessful in Celauro v. United States, Internal Revenue Service.  Some tax protesters contend that the U.S. Supreme Court decision in Caha v. United States restricts the jurisdiction of the federal government to impose income taxes inside the "states", based on the following language from the Court's opinion:

Some tax protesters contend that the Court's reference to "those matters" restricted the federal government's jurisdiction over matters of taxation. Caha is not a tax case. The reference to "this statute" was a reference to a perjury statute. The Caha case involved a perjury conviction where the defendant unsuccessfully argued that the federal court had no jurisdiction over a prosecution for the crime of perjury committed in a proceeding in a land office at Kingfisher, Oklahoma regarding ownership of real estate.

The reference in Caha to the "laws of congress in respect to those matters" was a reference to the matters of preservation of the peace and the protection of person and property. The Court in Caha rejected the argument that the federal courts had no jurisdiction to hear a case under the perjury statute, and the defendant's conviction was affirmed. No issues involving the power to impose and enforce federal taxes in the fifty states were presented to or decided by the court in Caha.

The courts have uniformly rejected the "federal zone" argument that congressional authority to impose an income tax is limited to the District of Columbia, forts, magazines, arsenals, or dockyards, etc. See, for example, United States v. Mundt; Nelsen v. Commissioner; Abbs v. Imhoff.

Definition of income

Stratton's Independence, Limited v. Howbert 
Some tax protesters have cited the U.S. Supreme Court case of Stratton's Independence, Ltd. v. Howbert for the argument that an income tax on an individual's income is unconstitutional. This was an argument raised unsuccessfully by John B. Hill, Jr., in Hill v. United States. and without success by John B. Cameron, Jr., in Cameron v. Internal Revenue Serv.. In Stratton, a mining corporation argued that the 1909 corporation tax act did not apply to that corporation. The U.S. Supreme Court ruled that the 1909 corporation tax act did apply to mining corporations, and that the proceeds of ores mined by the corporation from its own premises were income within the meaning of the 1909 tax act. The Court also ruled that the corporation was not entitled to deduct "the value of such ore in place and before it is mined" as depreciation within the meaning of the 1909 Act.  The Stratton case involved income taxation of a corporation, not of individuals. The Court in the Stratton case did not rule any corporate or individual income tax as unconstitutional.

Doyle v. Mitchell Bros. Co. 
Some tax protesters have cited Doyle v. Mitchell Bros. Co. for the proposition that income of individuals cannot be taxed. This was the argument raised unsuccessfully by Joseph T. Tornichio in the case of Tornichio v. United States and by Joram Perl in Perl v. United States (also unsuccessfully). The following language is sometimes cited by protesters:

The above verbiage is immediately followed in the text of the case by this sentence:

In Doyle, the taxpayer was a corporation engaged in the manufacture of lumber. The Corporation Excise Tax Act of 1909 was enacted on August 5, 1909, and was effective retroactively to January 1, 1909. For the years 1909 through 1912, the taxpayer filed tax returns under the 1909 Act, showing gross receipts from the sale of manufactured lumber and, in arriving at the amount of net income subject to tax under the 1909 Act, deducted an amount based on the $40-per-acre value, rather than the actual cost of about $20 per acre. The Commissioner of Internal Revenue argued that the taxpayer should be able to deduct only an amount based on the taxpayer's historical cost basis of $20, rather than the $40 fair market value at the time the 1909 Act became effective. (Essentially, if the taxpayer were allowed to use the $40 per acre value as its basis rather than the actual $20 historical cost basis, a portion of the taxpayer's gain — the increase in value from 1903 to December 31, 1908 — would go untaxed.)

The U.S. Supreme Court ruled that under the 1909 Act — which had become effective January 1, 1909 — the taxpayer should be taxed only on the increase in value after 1908. Increases in value prior to the effective date of the statute were not to be taxed under the terms of that statute. Thus, the taxpayer was entitled to deduct, from its gross receipts from the sale of finished lumber, a basis amount computed with reference to the $40 per acre value as of December 31, 1908.  Doyle is a case involving statutory (not constitutional) interpretation. In this case, the Court was interpreting the 1909 statute. Although some tax protesters cite this case for an argument about the constitutional definition of income as excluding income of individuals, no issues involving the constitutional definition of income, or of income under any other tax statutes, were presented to or decided by the Court.

The case is also notable for the fact that it involved a retroactively imposed tax. The taxpayer did not argue — and the Court did not rule — that as a general proposition taxes could not be imposed retroactively. Indeed, the tax in this case was imposed retroactively; the statute was enacted in August 1909 but was made effective retroactively to January 1, 1909.

Corporate profits 
One argument repeatedly made by tax protesters is that the income of individuals is not taxable because income should mean only "corporate profits" or "corporate gain". This is the Merchants' Loan argument, named after the case of Merchants' Loan & Trust Company, as Trustee of the Estate of Arthur Ryerson, Deceased, Plaintiff in Error v. Julius F. Smietanka, formerly United States Collector of Internal Revenue for the First District of the State of Illinois.  The argument is essentially that "income" for federal income tax purposes means only the income of a corporation — not the income of a non-corporate taxpayer — because the United States Supreme Court in that case, in discussing the meaning of income, mentioned a statute enacted in 1909 that taxed the income of corporations.

The Court in Merchants' Loan was specifically interpreting a 1916 statute imposing income taxes on individuals and estates (among other kinds of entities), and not the 1909 corporate tax statute. The taxpayer in Merchants' Loan was not a corporation but was the "Estate of Arthur Ryerson, Deceased". The Court was not presented with (and did not decide) any issue involving the taxability of "corporate profits" or "corporate gains" or any other kind of income except the gain on the sale of the stock by the "Estate of Arthur Ryerson, Deceased". The terms "corporate profit" and "corporate gain" are not found in the text of the Court's decision in Merchants' Loan.  In Merchants' Loan, the Supreme Court ruled that under the Sixteenth Amendment to the United States Constitution and the 1916 tax statute applicable at the time, a gain on a sale of stock by the estate of a deceased person is included in the income of that estate, and is therefore taxable to that estate for federal income tax purposes.

The Merchants' Loan argument has been litigated by tax protesters several times, and the courts have uniformly rejected the argument that income consists only of corporate profits. See, for example: Cameron v. Internal Revenue Serv., Stoewer v. Commissioner, Reinhart v. United States, Fink v. Commissioner; Flathers v. Commissioner; Schroeder v. Commissioner; Sherwood v. Commissioner; Ho v. Commissioner; and Zook v. Commissioner. Tax protesters — who have lost every case using Merchants' Loan for the theory that only "corporate profits" could be taxable — are citing a case where the U.S. Supreme Court ruled that the income of a non-corporate taxpayer is taxable. Neither the United States Supreme Court nor any other federal court has ever ruled that under the Internal Revenue Code the term "income" means only the income of a corporation for federal income tax purposes.

Some tax protesters have cited the Supreme Court case of Flint v. Stone Tracy Co. for the argument that only corporate profits or income can be taxed, using the following quotation:

In Flint v. Stone Tracy Co., the U.S. Supreme Court ruled that the corporation tax act of 1909 did not violate the constitutional requirement that revenue measures originate in the U.S. House of Representatives. The Court did not rule that excise taxes consisted only of taxes on corporations and corporate privileges, to the exclusion of taxes on individuals (natural persons). The issue of the validity of an income tax imposed on individuals was neither presented to the Court nor decided by the Court.

The courts have rejected the argument that Flint v. Stone Tracy Co. can be used to avoid taxation of wages. For example, in Parker v. Commissioner, a case where a taxpayer unsuccessfully argued that wages were not taxable, the United States Court of Appeals for the Fifth Circuit stated (in part):

The argument that only corporations are subject to federal income tax, and variations of this argument, have been officially identified as legally frivolous federal tax return positions for purposes of the $5,000 frivolous tax return penalty imposed under Internal Revenue Code section 6702(a).

Cases indicating definition of income is irrelevant
At least two federal courts have indicated that Congress may constitutionally tax an item as "income," regardless of whether that item is "income" within the meaning of the Sixteenth Amendment. In Penn Mutual Indemnity Co. v. Commissioner, the United States Court of Appeals for the Third Circuit stated:

In Murphy v. Internal Revenue Serv., the United States Court of Appeals for the District of Columbia Circuit ruled that a personal injury award received by a taxpayer was "within the reach of the congressional power to tax under Article I, Section 8 of the Constitution" — even if the award was "not income within the meaning of the Sixteenth Amendment".

Progressive taxation
One argument that has been raised is that because the federal income tax is progressive (i.e., because the marginal tax rates increase, or progress, as the level of taxable income increases), the discriminations and inequalities created by the tax should render the tax unconstitutional. This argument was rejected by the United States Supreme Court in two companion cases — with respect to the income tax on individuals in Thorne v. Anderson, and with respect to the income tax on corporations in Tyee Realty Co. v. Anderson.

Taxing labor or income from labor
Several tax protesters assert that the Congress has no constitutional power to tax labor or income from labor, citing a variety of court cases. These arguments include claims that the word "income" as used in the Sixteenth Amendment cannot be interpreted as applying to wages; that wages are not income because labor is exchanged for them; that taxing wages violates individuals' right to property; that an income tax on wages is illegal as a direct tax on the source of income, and several others.

Another protester argument is that the U.S. Constitution authorizes the income tax only on income derived from activities that are government-licensed or otherwise specially protected. The courts have rejected this theory, ruling that "Congress has taxed compensation for services, without any regard for whether that compensation is derived from government-licensed or specially protected activities, … and this has been construed to cover earnings from labor."

Robert L. Schulz and his We the People Foundation take the positions that the government "is clearly prohibited from doing what it is doing – taxing the salaries, wages and compensation of the working men and women of this country and forcing the business entities that utilize the labor of ordinary American citizens to withhold and turn over to the IRS a part of the earnings of those workers" and "that the federal government DOES NOT possess ANY legal authority –statutory or Constitutional– to tax the wages or salaries of American workers."

Similarly, tax protester Tom Cryer, who was acquitted of willful failure to file U.S. Federal income tax returns in a timely fashion, argued that "the law does not tax [a person's] wages", and that the federal government cannot tax "[m]oney that you earned [and] paid for with your labor and industry"  because "the Constitution does not allow the federal government to tax those earnings" (referring to "wages, salaries and fees that [a person] earn[s] for [himself]").

Arguments about the taxability of compensation for personal services, whether called wages, salary, or some other term, may be either constitutional arguments as in United States v. Connor (see below) or statutory arguments as in Cheek v. United States, depending on the details of the argument. For purposes of presentation, these arguments are summarized here rather than in the article Tax protester statutory arguments. The rest of this section explains these arguments in more detail.

Evans v. Gore
Some protesters include false quotations in their arguments. Radio personality Dave Champion contends that the following verbiage is a quotation from the case of Evans v. Gore in his own arguments on the internet about federal income taxes:

The quoted material by Dave Champion is false; it does not appear in the Court's decision. In Evans v. Gore, the U.S. Supreme Court actually did rule that a federal income tax on certain income of federal judges was unconstitutional. The Evans v. Gore ruling has been interpreted as barring application of the Federal income tax to a Federal judge who had been appointed prior to the enactment of the tax. This was the Court's year 1920 interpretation of the "Compensation Clause", the rule that Federal judges "shall, at stated Times, receive for their Services a Compensation, which shall not be diminished during their Continuance in Office" under Article III, section 1 of the U.S. Constitution. The decision in Evans v. Gore was eviscerated in the 1939 U.S. Supreme Court decision of O'Malley v. Woodrough, and was expressly overruled by the U.S. Supreme Court itself in 2001, in the case of United States v. Hatter. In Hatter, the Supreme Court stated: "We now overrule Evans insofar as it holds that the Compensation Clause forbids Congress to apply a generally applicable, nondiscriminatory tax to the salaries of federal judges, whether or not they were appointed before enactment of the tax."

Neither the Supreme Court nor any other federal court has ever ruled that the Sixteenth Amendment (or any other part of the Constitution) does not authorize a Federal income tax on compensation for personal services.

Southern Pacific Co. v. Lowe
Another United States Supreme Court case frequently cited by tax protesters is Southern Pacific Co. v. Lowe,. Tax protesters attribute the following quotation to the Court in this case: "income; as used in the statute should be given a meaning so as not to include everything that comes in." The quotation does not appear in the text of the Supreme Court decision.

This case began in the United States District Court for the Southern District of New York. In the decision in that court, the trial court judge stated: "I do not think that 'income' as used in the statute, should be given a meaning so as to include everything that comes in." The case did not involve compensation for labor or services. Instead, the case involved the federal income tax treatment of dividends paid by the Central Pacific Railway Company to its parent company, the Southern Pacific Company, which owned 100% of the stock of Central Pacific Railway Company. The District Court ruled that the dividends were taxable to the Southern Pacific Company. This decision was reversed by the Supreme Court.

What the U.S. Supreme Court actually said was:

In Southern Pacific Company v. Lowe, the Supreme Court ruled that where a shareholder receives a dividend representing earnings of a corporation realized by the corporation prior to January 1, 1913, the dividend is not includible in the gross income of the shareholder for purposes of the Federal Income Tax Act of 1913, Ch. 16, 38 Stat. 114 (Oct. 3, 1913). No issues involving the definition of income with respect to wages, salary or other compensation for labor were decided by the Court.

Colonial Pipeline Co. v. Traigle
Another case that has been cited for the argument that wages are not taxable is the United States Supreme Court decision in Colonial Pipeline Co. v. Traigle. An individual named "William Dixon" at a web site called "godissovereignfast" claims that the following is a statement by the U.S. Supreme Court in that case:

This material alleged to be a quotation does not appear in the text of the case at all. Also, the words "wages" and "salaries" are not found anywhere in the text, and there is no ruling in that case that the federal income tax statutes apply only to "corporations." The Colonial Pipeline case actually involved the Louisiana corporate franchise tax, not a federal tax. The validity of the Louisiana franchise tax was upheld by the U.S. Supreme Court in this case. No issues involving the validity or applicability of federal income taxes were presented to, mentioned by, or decided by the Supreme Court in the Colonial Pipeline case.

Lucas v. Earl
For the argument that wages are not taxable, some tax protesters—including convicted tax offender Irwin Schiff—incorrectly attribute to the U.S. Supreme Court the following language in connection with the leading tax case of Lucas v. Earl:

This language is not from the Court's opinion in Lucas v. Earl. Instead, it is an almost direct quotation from page 17 of the taxpayer's brief filed in the case. Guy C. Earl was the taxpayer, and the brief was written by Earl's attorneys: Warren Olney Jr., J.M. Mannon, Jr., and Henry D. Costigan. In some printed versions of the case, this statement and other quotations and paraphrases from pages 8, 10, 14, 15, 17, and 18 of the taxpayer's brief are re-printed as a headnote or syllabus above the opinion of the Court. In the case reprints that include this headnote (and many of them do not even show it), these excerpts are not clearly identified as being from the taxpayer's brief. A person not trained in analysis of legal materials would not necessarily know that this verbiage, like any headnote or syllabus, is not part of the Court's opinion, perhaps leading to the confusion about the source of the quotation. As explained below, the Supreme Court rejected the arguments in the quotation, and the taxpayer lost the case.

Lucas v. Earl is a leading case in the area of U.S. income taxation, and stands for the Anticipatory Assignment of Income Doctrine. In the case, Mr. Earl was arguing that because he and his wife, in the year 1901, had made a legally valid assignment agreement (for state law purposes) to have his then-current and after-acquired income (which was earned solely by him) be treated as the income of both him and his wife as joint tenants with right of survivorship, the assignment agreement should also determine the federal income tax effect of the income he earned (i.e., only half the income should be taxed to him).

The U.S. Supreme Court rejected that argument, essentially ruling that under federal income tax law all the future income earned by Mr. Earl was taxable to him at the time he earned the income, even though he had already assigned part of the income to his wife, and regardless of the validity of the assignment agreement under state law. The Court in Lucas v. Earl did not rule that wages are not taxable.

Coppage v. Kansas
One case frequently cited by tax protesters for the "wages are not taxable" argument is Coppage v. Kansas with respect to the following quotation:

Coppage was a criminal case involving a defendant convicted, under a Kansas statute, of firing an employee for refusing to resign as a member of a labor union. No issues of taxation were presented to or decided by the Court, and the word "tax" is not found in the text of the Court's decision.

Truax v. Corrigan
Tax protesters also cite or quote  from the case of Truax v. Corrigan for the argument that an income tax should not be imposed on labor and at least arguably relating "labor" to a right of "property":

The Truax case involved a Mr. William Truax who owned a restaurant called "English Kitchen," in Bisbee, Arizona. A Mr. Michael Corrigan and others were former cooks and waiters at the restaurant. Corrigan and others allegedly instituted a boycott of the restaurant, after a dispute arose over the terms and conditions of employment. A strike was allegedly ordered by a local union with respect to certain union members employed at the restaurant. The restaurant's business was allegedly harmed, and Mr. Truax sued various parties on a variety of grounds. The lawsuit was thrown out by the trial court before the case could be heard, on the theory that Mr. Truax was incorrect as a matter of law. Mr. Truax appealed and the case eventually ended up in the U.S. Supreme Court. The U.S. Supreme Court ruled that the trial court should not have thrown out the lawsuit, but should have heard Mr. Truax's case. The case was sent back to the trial court so that a trial could take place. Truax was not a tax case. No issues involving taxation were presented to or decided by the Court.

Butchers' Union Co. v. Crescent City Co.
Tax protesters also cite the U.S. Supreme Court case of Butcher's Union Co. v. Crescent City Co. for the argument that an income tax should not be imposed on labor, sometimes quoting the following language:

Butchers' Union Co. was a case involving interpretation of the Louisiana Constitution and certain ordinances of the city of New Orleans. The Court ruled that the Louisiana Constitution and the New Orleans ordinances did not impermissibly impair a pre-existing obligation under a contract when those laws effectively ended a slaughter-house business monopoly by the Crescent City Company. No issues regarding the power to tax incomes from businesses, vocations, or labor were presented to or decided by the Court, and the word "tax" does not appear in the text of the decision.

Murdock case
Tax protesters also cite the case of Murdock v. Pennsylvania (also known as Jones v. City of Opelika):

Murdock (or Jones v. City of Opelika) was a case involving the validity of a city ordinance (in Jeannette, Pennsylvania) worded as follows:

A group of people who were Jehovah's Witnesses went from door to door distributing literature in the town. They failed to obtain the license under the ordinance. The case ended up in court, and went all the way to the U.S. Supreme Court, which stated:

The protester argument appears to be that the federal government should not be able to tax income from labor because it would be a tax on an exercise of the freedoms mentioned in the quotation. The "tax" in this case was, in effect, a license fee imposed on door to door sales people under a city ordinance. The city was trying to exact the fee from Jehovah's Witness members who were going door to door. Questions about the validity of federal income taxes were neither presented to nor decided by the Court.

Redfield v. Fisher
Some tax protesters cite or quote from Redfield v. Fisher:

The argument seems to be that because "the individual's rights to live and own property" are arguably rights against which "an excise cannot be imposed," the federal income tax on income from labor should therefore be unconstitutional. However, Redfield v. Fisher is an Oregon Supreme Court case, not a federal case. No issues involving the validity of federal income tax laws were decided by the court.

Conner v. United States
Some tax protesters cite a case called Conner v. United States, with a quotation that "Congress has taxed income, not compensation" for the argument that wages are not taxable. This was the case cited unsuccessfully by LaKerra Sumter before the U.S. Court of Federal Claims in the case of Sumter v. United States. The Conner case involved the taxability of compensation paid by an insurance company to a policy holder whose house had burned down. The insurance company was reimbursing the homeowner for the costs of renting a place to stay after the home burned down — under the terms of the insurance policy. The insurance company was not paying "wages". The court was not presented with, and did not decide, any issue involving the taxability of wages.

Eisner v. Macomber
Some tax protesters have cited the U.S. Supreme Court decision in the case of Eisner v. Macomber for the theory that wages are not taxable, or for the theory that dividends are not taxable. The case dealt with a stock dividend on stock that was essentially equivalent to a stock split, as opposed to a cash dividend on stock. In the case of this kind of "dividend" the stockholder does not receive anything or realize any additional value. For example, if a stockholder owns 100 shares of stock having a value of $4 per share, the total value is $400. If the corporation declares, say, a "two for one" stock dividend that is essentially similar to a stock split (and the corporation distributes no money or other property), the stockholder now has 200 shares with a value of $2 each, which is still $400 in value - i.e., no increase in value and no income. The pie is still the same size — but it's sliced into more pieces, each piece being proportionately smaller.

More directly to the point, there has been no "sale or other disposition" of the stock. The taxpayer still owns the same asset (i.e., the same interest in the corporation) he owned prior to the stock dividend. So, even if his basis amount (generally, the amount he originally paid for the stock) is less than the $400 value (i.e., even if he has an unrealized or potential gain), he still has not yet "realized" the gain. The Court ruled that this kind of stock dividend is not treated as "income" to a shareholder.

The Court in this case did not rule on any issue involving the taxability of labor or income from labor, or wages, salary or ordinary "cash" dividends — where the stockholder actually receives a check from the company, etc. Indeed, the terms "wage" and "salary" do not appear in the text of the decision in Eisner v. Macomber.

Cases where wages or labor ruled taxable
The provisions of the U.S. Constitution authorizing Congress to impose taxes, duties, imposts and excises contain no express exceptions for taxes on wages or labor, or for taxes on income from labor. The courts have consistently rejected arguments that "wages" or "labor" (whether denominated as "labor property" or not) cannot be taxed under the Internal Revenue Code. The United States Court of Appeals for the Eighth Circuit has stated: "Taxpayers' argument that compensation for labor is not constitutionally subject to the federal income tax is without merit. There is no constitutional impediment to levying an income tax on compensation for a taxpayer's labors." See also:

United States v.
Parker v.
Perkins v.
Sisemore v.
White v. United States (taxpayer's argument that wages are not taxable was ruled frivolous by the United States Court of Appeals for the Sixth Circuit; penalty — imposed under  for filing tax return with frivolous position — was therefore proper);
Granzow v.
United States v.
Waters v.

Related tax protester arguments with respect to wages paid by "employers" to "employees" are (1) that only federal officers, federal employees, elected officials, or corporate officers are "employees" for purposes of federal income tax, (2) that the inclusion of the United States government within the definition of the term "employer" operates to exclude all other employers from the definition, and (3) that with respect to compensation, the tax is imposed only on compensation paid to federal government employees. These arguments have been rejected in court rulings.

Another tax protester argument is that income from labor should not be taxable because any amount the worker receives in exchange for his or her labor is received in an exchange of "equal value," although an exchange in any true "arm's length" fair market value transaction is, essentially by definition, an exchange of equal value. See, for example, the decision of the United States Court of Appeals for the Ninth Circuit in United States v. Buras, in which the taxpayer's theory — that wages were not taxable because (1) "only profit or gain, such as that from the sale of a capital asset, constituted income subject to federal tax" and (2) "[w]ages could not constitute gain or profit because wages merely represent an equivalent exchange for one's labor" — was rejected. See also the decision of the United States Tax Court in Link v. Commissioner, where the taxpayer's argument — that pension income is "labor property" and that when taxpayer receives his pension income from his former employer for whom he once performed services (or labor), any amount he receives in exchange for his labor is a nontaxable exchange of equal value — was rejected. In Boggs v. Commissioner, a penalty of $8,000 was imposed by the United States Court of Appeals for the Sixth Circuit on the taxpayers for filing a frivolous appeal using the argument that a portion of a wage amount was not taxable as a return on "human capital."

Further, under the U.S. federal tax laws, even if labor were considered "property" the gain or income from "labor property" would be defined as the excess of the amount realized (for example, the money received) by the taxpayer over the amount of the taxpayer's "adjusted basis" in the "property" (see ). Since the taxpayer can have only a zero "basis" amount in his or her own labor — the personal living expenses incurred to generate labor being both non-capitalizable and, under , non-deductible — the "gain" would thus be equal to the amount of compensation received by the taxpayer. Compare Carter v. Commissioner, where the United States Court of Appeals for the Ninth Circuit stated: "The assertion that proceeds received for personal services cannot be given a 'zero-basis for the purpose of the assessment of taxation,' is frivolous. This is a variation of the 'wages are not income' theme, which has been rejected repeatedly by this court." See also Reading v. See also Burnett v. Commissioner (taxpayer's argument — that wages represent an equal exchange of property and, therefore, are not taxable income — was rejected). See also In re Myrland (ruling that a taxpayer is not entitled to deduct the value of his labor from his income in calculating his taxes).

Wages and salaries, the Sixteenth Amendment, and the Cheek case
In dicta in Cheek v. United States, the United States Supreme Court specifically labeled defendant John Cheek's arguments about the constitutionality of the tax law — arguments Cheek had raised in various prior court cases — as "frivolous." Prior to his conviction, John Cheek had specifically contended that the Sixteenth Amendment did not authorize a tax on wages and salaries, but only on gain or profit.

Monetary penalties for asserting the argument on tax return
The argument that wages, tips and other compensation received for the performance of personal services are not taxable income, the argument that such items are offset by an equivalent deduction, the argument that a person has a "basis" in his or her labor equal to the fair market value of the wages received, and variations of these arguments, have been officially identified as legally frivolous federal tax return positions for purposes of the $5,000 frivolous tax return penalty imposed under Internal Revenue Code section 6702(a).

See also
 Tax protester history in the United States
 Taxation in the United States

Notes

References
  also as PDF
 
 
 
 Danshera Cords, Tax Protestors and Penalties: Ensuring Perceived Fairness and Mitigating Systemic Costs, 2005 B.Y.U.L. Rev. 1515 (2005).
 Kenneth H. Ryesky, Of Taxes and Duties: Taxing the System with Public Employees' Tax Obligations, 31 Akron L. Rev. 349 (1998).
 Christopher S. Jackson, "The Inane Gospel of Tax Protest: Resist Rendering Unto Caesar - Whatever His Demands", 32 Gonzaga Law Review 291-329 (1996–97).

External links
 Tax Protester FAQ - specific rebuttals concerning tax protester arguments
 The Truth About Frivolous Tax Arguments- The official response of the IRS.

United States constitutional law
Taxation in the United States
Tax resistance in the United States
Sovereign citizen movement